The cultural perspective on Earth, or the world, varies by society and time period. Religious beliefs often include a creation belief as well as personification in the form of a deity. The exploration of the world has modified many of the perceptions of the planet, resulting in a viewpoint of a globally integrated ecosystem. Unlike the remainder of the planets in the Solar System, mankind didn't perceive the Earth as a planet until the sixteenth century.

Etymology 
Unlike the other planets in the Solar System, in English, Earth does not directly share a name with an ancient Roman deity. The name Earth derives from the eighth century Anglo-Saxon word erda, which means ground or soil, and ultimately descends from Proto-Indo European *erþō. From this it has cognates throughout the Germanic languages, including with Jörð, the name of the giantess of Norse myth. Earth was first used as the name of the sphere of the Earth in the early fifteenth century. The planet's name in Latin, used academically and scientifically in the West during the Renaissance, is the same as that of Terra Mater, the Roman goddess, which translates to English as Mother Earth.

Planetary symbol

The standard astronomical symbol of the Earth consists of a cross circumscribed by a circle. This symbol is known as the wheel cross, sun cross, Odin's cross or Woden's cross. Although it has been used in various cultures for different purposes, it came to represent the compass points, Earth and the land. Another version of the symbol is a cross on top of a circle; a stylized globus cruciger that was also used as an early astronomical symbol for the planet Earth.

Religious beliefs

Earth has often been personified as a deity, in particular a goddess. In many cultures the mother goddess is also portrayed as a fertility deity. To the Aztecs, Earth was called Tonantzin—"our mother"; to the Incas, Earth was called Pachamama—"mother earth". The Chinese Earth goddess Hou Tu is similar to Gaia, the Greek goddess personifying the Earth. Bhuma Devi is the goddess of Earth in Hinduism, influenced by Graha. The Tuluva people of Tulunadu in Southern India celebrate a Three Day "Earth Day" called Keddaso. This festival comes in usually on 10th,12th,13 February every Calendar year. In Norse mythology, the Earth giantess Jörð was the mother of Thor and the daughter of Annar. Ancient Egyptian mythology is different from that of other cultures because Earth (Geb) is male and the sky (Nut) is female. However, in roughly 3500 BCE Moses began writing the book of Genesis in which the first verse of the Bible translates "In the beginning God created the heavens and the Earth."

Creation myths in many religions recall a story involving the creation of the world by a supernatural deity or deities. A variety of religious groups, often associated with fundamentalist branches of Protestantism or Islam, assert that their interpretations of the accounts of creation in sacred texts are literal truth and should be considered alongside or replace conventional scientific accounts of the formation of the Earth and the origin and development of life. Such assertions are opposed by the scientific community as well as other religious groups. A prominent example is the creation–evolution controversy.

Creation myths in different cultures and religions

Babylonian 
Tiāmat is a sea monster known as the monster of monsters. She is killed and her body is cut in half in order to create heaven and earth. The upper part of Tiāmat is used to create heaven with her belly as the separation line. The lower part of her body was used to create earth, but the way that specific body parts were used to create other things is not described.

Norse 
Odin and his two brothers killed the frost-giant Ymir and took his body with them. From Ymir’s body Odin and his brothers created what we know as earth. As Ymir’s blood drained from his body, Odin created oceans and lakes, from his teeth they formed broken bits of rocks and placed them on mountains, from his bones they made boulders, his skull fashioned the sky and respectively his brain formed clouds. After Odin’s creation of earth he sent four dwarves down to each corner of the earth one being Austri meaning east, another called Vestri meaning west, another named Nordri meaning north, and the final one named Sudri meaning south. This is where we get our directions from. Odin and his brothers then set out to make the first people. Odin and his brothers gathered wood from the seashore and created the first people, Ask being the man and Embla being the woman. Light and dark was the final step that Odin had to create. He took Night who is the daughter of a giant that is dark in color. Odin gave Night a chariot pulled by a horse called Hrimfaxi. He instructed Night to ride around the earth and with her she brought darkness, from her horse’s saliva dew was created. He then took Day, the son of Night and Delling of the AEsir, who was bright and attractive and gave him a chariot pulled by a horse named Skinfaxi. He instructed Day to ride around the earth and with him he brought light and from his horse’s mane streamed light.

Aztec 
In the myth of the god Tlaltecuhtli, her dismembered body was the basis for the world in the Aztec creation story of the fifth and final cosmos. Before the fifth sun was created, the "earth monster" dwelled in the ocean after the fourth Great Flood. The gods Quetzalcoatl and Tezcatlipoca descended from the heavens in the form of serpents and found the monstrous Tlaltecuhtli. The two gods decided that the fifth cosmos could not prosper with such a horrible creature roaming the world, and so they set out to destroy her. After a long struggle, Tezcatlipoca and Quetzalcoatl managed to rip her body in two — from the upper half came the sky, and from the lower came the earth. The other gods were angered to hear of Tlaltecuhtli's treatment and decreed that the various parts of her dismembered body would become the features of the new world. Her skin became grasses and small flowers, her hair the trees and herbs, her eyes the springs and wells, her nose the hills and valleys, her shoulders the mountains, and her mouth the caves and rivers.

Yoruba 
In the Yoruba religion, there are many gods, but the First Father is called Olorun and he is said to be perfect. Before earth was created there was only sky above and water, swamps, and mist below. One day one of the gods named Olbatala asked Olorun if he could make a world out of what was below. Olorun granted him permission to make a world from the things down below. Before taking action, Obatala consulted with another god named Orunmila (the god of divination) who told Obatala to get a golden chain and lower it from the sky to the waters below so that he could eventually return to the other gods. Orunmila also told him to take a snail shell with soil in it, a hen, a black cat, and a palm nut. Obatala heeded the god of divination’s words and descended the golden chain with all of the things he was told to take. Once Obatala reached the waters below he poured all of the soil onto the water. He then set the hen down which spread the soil out by pecking and scratching at it. After the soil was spread, he planted the palm nut which grew and produced more nuts which respectively grew more trees. Obatala thought that this new world needed more light, so he consulted with Olorun who then created the sun and moon and sent fire on a vulture’s head for light when the sun was gone. Obatala got lonely on this new world of his, so he fashioned human beings out of clay and asked the First Father for help. Olorun breathed life into the clay figures and humans became living. Olorun also gave life to animals, plants, rivers, and language for the people to utilize. When Obatala was pleased with his work he climbed back up the golden chain and lived with the other gods in the sky above.

In fiction 
While in general, a planet can be considered "too large, and its lifetime too long, to be comfortably accommodated within fiction as a topic in its own right," this has not prevented some writers from engaging with the topic (for example, Camille Flammarion's Lumen (1887), David Brin's Earth (1990) or Terry Pratchett's, Ian Stewart's and Jack Cohen's The Science of Discworld (1999)). The iconic photo of Earth known as The Blue Marble, taken by the crew of Apollo 17 (1972), and similar images of Earth from space, might have popularized Earth as a theme in fiction.

Additionally, it is undeniable that an overwhelming majority of fiction is set on or features the Earth. Earth as a planet has been subject to various works of literary treatments. Its climate itself is related to the entire genre known as climate fiction, and its future is a major aspect of the Dying Earth genre as well as the apocalyptic and post-apocalyptic fiction.

Images of Earth
In the ancient past there were varying levels of belief in a flat Earth, with the Mesopotamian culture portraying the world as a flat disk afloat in an ocean. The spherical form of the Earth was suggested by early Greek philosophers; a belief espoused by Pythagoras. By the Middle Ages—as evidenced by thinkers such as Thomas Aquinas—European belief in a spherical Earth was widespread.

Images of Earth from space

The technological developments of the latter half of the 20th century are widely considered to have altered the public's perception of the Earth. Before space flight, the popular image of Earth was of a green world. Science fiction artist Frank R. Paul provided perhaps the first image of a cloudless blue planet (with sharply defined land masses) on the back cover of the July 1940 issue of Amazing Stories, a common depiction for several decades thereafter.
Earth was first photographed from a satellite by Explorer 6 in 1959. Yuri Gagarin became the first human to view Earth from space in 1961. The crew of the Apollo 8 was the first to view an Earth-rise from lunar orbit in 1968, and astronaut William Anders's photograph of it, Earthrise, became iconic. In 1972 the crew of the Apollo 17 produced The Blue Marble, another famous photograph of the planet Earth from cislunar space. These became iconic images of the planet as a marble of cloud-swirled blue ocean broken by green-brown continents. NASA archivist Mike Gentry has speculated that The Blue Marble is the most widely distributed image in human history. Inspired by The Blue Marble poet-diplomat Abhay K has penned an Earth Anthem describing the planet as a "Cosmic Blue Pearl". 
A photo taken of a distant Earth by Voyager 1 in 1990 inspired Carl Sagan to name it and describe the planet as a Pale Blue Dot.

Since the 1960s, Earth has also been described as a massive "Spaceship Earth," with a life support system that requires maintenance, or, in the Gaia hypothesis, as having a biosphere that forms one large organism.
Since 2010 the Cupola of the ISS has allowed for a wealth of intricate images of Earth from orbit.

Notable images of Earth from space

Impact of images of Earth from space

Over the past two centuries a growing environmental movement has emerged that is concerned about humankind's effects on the Earth. The key issues of this socio-political movement are the conservation of natural resources, elimination of pollution, and the usage of land. Although diverse in interests and goals, environmentalists as a group tend to advocate sustainable management of resources and stewardship of the environment through changes in public policy and individual behavior. Of particular concern is the large-scale exploitation of non-renewable resources. Changes sought by the environmental movements are sometimes in conflict with commercial interests due to the additional costs associated with managing the environmental impact of those interests.

See also
Earth globe#History
Flag of Earth

Notes

References

 
Cultural geography